Nelson Edward Gaetz (March 1, 1907 – April 26, 1988) was a Canadian politician. He represented the electoral district of Halifax East in the Nova Scotia House of Assembly from 1963 to 1967. He was a member of the Progressive Conservative Party of Nova Scotia.

Born in 1907 at Chezzetcook, Nova Scotia, Gaetz was a farmer. He married Sadie Theresa Gaetz in 1931. Gaetz first attempted to enter provincial politics in the 1960 election, but was defeated by Liberal incumbent Duncan MacMillan in the Halifax East riding. In May 1962, Gaetz was elected a municipal councillor for Halifax County. He ran again in the 1963 provincial election, and defeated MacMillan by 305 votes. In the 1967 election, Gaetz was defeated by MacMillan in the new Halifax Eastern Shore riding. Gaetz died on April 26, 1988.

References

1907 births
1988 deaths
Progressive Conservative Association of Nova Scotia MLAs
Nova Scotia municipal councillors